Funemployed is a portmanteau of fun and unemployed. It may refer to:

Funemployed (web series)
Funemployed (EP), a 2013 EP by Gnarwolves
Funemployed (book), a book and album by Justin Heazlewood